Hatta was a Palestinian Arab village of 1,125 inhabitants that was depopulated after a July 17, 1948 assault by Israeli forces of the Givati Brigade during the 1948 Arab-Israeli war. Following the war the area was incorporated into the State of Israel and   Zavdiel and Aluma were established on the land that had belonged to Hatta.

Location
The village was situated in a flat area on the southern coastal plain. It was probably named after the al-Hut tribe, originally from Najd in central Arabia, who camped near the site at the end of the fifth century A.D.

History
The Arab geographer Yaqut al-Hamawi (d. 1228) referred to the village as Hattawa and said it was the home of the Islamic scholar ´Amru al-Hattawi.

Ottoman era
Hatta, like the rest of Palestine, was incorporated into the Ottoman Empire in 1517, and in the tax registers of 1596 it appeared under the name of Hatta as-Sajara as being  in the nahiya of Gazza, part of the  Sanjak of Gaza. It had a population of 15 households, all Muslim. The inhabitants  paid a fixed tax rate of 25% on wheat, barley, sesame, goats and/or beehives; a total of 5,600 akçe.

Edward Robinson passed by the village in 1838, and described its houses as being made of adobe bricks. It was also  noted as a Muslim village in the  Gaza district.

In 1863  Victor Guérin visited the village, which  he estimated it to have 600 inhabitants. He noticed that beside the well were four barrels of broken columns, three gray-white marble, and the fourth of bluish marble. The latter, placed horizontally at the orifice was deeply furrowed by the rope that animals or men had used to raise the water. In a oualy dedicated to Neby  Amran he noticed some stones with the same ancient look.
Around the village  were large plantations of tobacco,  here and there also stood several groups of beautiful pine, olive and fig trees.

An Ottoman village list of about 1870 showed that Hatta had 78 houses and a population of 211, though the population count included only men.  

In 1883 the PEF's Survey of Western Palestine (SWP) described the village as being surrounded by gardens, some of which contained a few tamarisk trees. SWP also wrote that the name Hatteh preserved the name of the Hittites.

British Mandate era
In the 1922 census of Palestine, conducted by the British Mandate authorities, Hatta  had a population of 570  Muslims, increasing in the 1931 census  to 646, still all Muslim, in  140 houses.

In the 1945 statistics  Hatta had a population of 970 Muslims,  with 5,305  dunams of land, according to an official land and population survey.   Of this, 4 dunams were plantations and irrigable land, 5,108 used for cereals, while 45  dunams were built-up land.

1948 and after

Hatta was captured on July 17–18, 1948, during Operation Death to the Invader, the last operation of the Ten Days period—the period between the two ceasefires of the 1948 Arab–Israeli War. Following the war the area was incorporated into the State of Israel and in August 1948 a moshav named Revaha was slated to be built on the site. However, the plan was not implemented until 1953. Another moshav, Zavdiel was established in 1950 on village land, while Aluma was founded on village land in 1965. Qomemiyyut  and Rewacha  are both close by, but not on village land.
 
Walid Khalidi described the village site in 1992: "A small portion of the site is covered by a forest, planted by Israelis. The debris of houses are scattered under the trees. Sycamore trees and cactuses also grow on the site. The surrounding lands are cultivated. The British built military airport is still in use."

See also
Operation An-Far
Depopulated Palestinian locations in Israel

References

Bibliography

External links
Welcome to Hatta Palestine Remembered
Hatta, Zochrot
Survey of Western Palestine, Map 20:   IAA, Wikimedia commons 
Hatta from the Khalil Sakakini Cultural Center

District of Gaza
Arab villages depopulated during the 1948 Arab–Israeli War